Thierry Rua Moutinho (born 26 February 1991) is a Portuguese professional footballer who plays for Super League Greece club Levadiakos FC as a midfielder.

He spent most of his career in Spain, making 99 Segunda División appearances and scoring nine goals for four clubs, mainly Mallorca. He also had spells in the top divisions of Switzerland, Romania and Greece.

Born in Switzerland, Moutinho was a youth international for Portugal.

Club career

Servette
Born in Geneva, Switzerland to Portuguese parents, Moutinho started playing football with Étoile Carouge FC. In 2009 he signed with Servette FC, completing his training with the club and making his first senior appearances in the Swiss Challenge League.

In 2010–11, Moutinho played five league games (one start) as Servette won promotion to the Super League. For the following season he was loaned to CD Badajoz in Spain but, after the sale of Matías Vitkieviez to BSC Young Boys in January 2012, he was recalled and assigned the #7 squad number, going on to feature in several matches towards the end of the campaign as the team from the Stade de Genève finished in fourth place.

Spain
Other than his spell with Badajoz, Moutinho spent several years competing in Spanish football, helping Albacete Balompié promote to Segunda División in 2014. He made his professional league debut in that country with that team, coming on as a second-half substitute in a 0–1 home loss against CD Numancia on 21 September 2014.

On 7 July 2015, Moutinho signed with RCD Mallorca on a two-year contract. He scored four goals in his second season, but the Balearic Islands club returned to Segunda División B after 36 years; during his spell, he was also loaned to CD Tenerife of the same league for five months.

Later years
Moutinho started the 2017–18 campaign in the Romanian Liga I, with CFR Cluj. On 27 December 2017, however, he returned to Spain and joined Cultural y Deportiva Leonesa on loan.

On 15 July 2019, Moutinho returned to the Romanian top flight and signed a contract with FCSB. The following transfer window, after 13 competitive appearances, the free agent returned to the Spanish third tier after agreeing to a six-month deal at Córdoba CF.

Moutinho moved to Levadiakos F.C. of Super League Greece 2 in August 2021. He won promotion as champions in his first season.

International career
Moutinho was part of the Portugal under-20 squad at the 2011 Toulon Tournament. He earned the first of his two caps for his country on 3 June, starting in a 1–1 group stage draw with Italy.

Career statistics

Club

Honours
CFR Cluj
Liga I: 2017–18, 2018–19
Supercupa României: 2018

FCSB
Cupa României: 2019–20

Levadiakos
Super League Greece 2: 2021–22

References

External links

1991 births
Living people
Swiss people of Portuguese descent
Citizens of Portugal through descent
Footballers from Geneva
Swiss men's footballers
Portuguese footballers
Association football midfielders
Swiss Super League players
Swiss Challenge League players
Étoile Carouge FC players
Servette FC players
Segunda División players
Segunda División B players
CD Badajoz players
Albacete Balompié players
RCD Mallorca players
CD Tenerife players
Cultural Leonesa footballers
Córdoba CF players
Liga I players
CFR Cluj players
FC Steaua București players
Super League Greece players
Super League Greece 2 players
Levadiakos F.C. players
Portugal youth international footballers
Swiss expatriate footballers
Portuguese expatriate footballers
Expatriate footballers in Spain
Expatriate footballers in Romania
Expatriate footballers in Greece
Swiss expatriate sportspeople in Spain
Swiss expatriate sportspeople in Romania
Swiss expatriate sportspeople in Greece
Portuguese expatriate sportspeople in Spain
Portuguese expatriate sportspeople in Romania
Portuguese expatriate sportspeople in Greece